The following is the qualification system and qualified athletes for the bodybuilding at the 2019 Pan American Games competitions.

Qualification system
A total of 32 athletes qualified. The top 15 athletes (one per nation) after reallocation and the host nation Peru, qualified in each event. Qualification was done at the 2018 Pan American Championships held in Antigua, Guatemala in November.

Qualification timeline

Qualification summary

Qualified NOC's

Countries are listed in alphabetical order after qualification and reallocation.

References

Qualification for the 2019 Pan American Games
Bodybuilding at the 2019 Pan American Games